Singmanee Kaewsamrit (Thai: สิงห์มณี แก้วสัมฤทธิ์; born April 14, 1982) is a Thai Muay Thai kickboxer. He is the former Rajadamnern Stadium Champion, WMC and WPMF Welterweight Champion. He is also the 2012 Thai Fight 67 kg Champion and Isuzu Cup 22 Champion.

Biography and career

The fights of Singmanee are always beautiful to see because this boxer controls at once the technique and the power. Dominant hand is his left hand, and hence his right leg is the lead leg. He beat the best of his category, being only defeated in front of tenors as Kem Sitsongpeenong. The list of the champions that he faced and beat is impressive, Petaswin Seatranferry (KO), Numphon P.K. Stereo (KO), Thanongdet Petphayathai, Jaroenchai Keza Gym, Kongfah Audonmueng, Olan Kaewsamrit, Noppadet Siangsimewgym, Saiyok Pumpanmuang, Big Ben Chor Praram 6.

It is a boxer been used to fight abroad and his weight of shape is between 64 kg and 67 kg, a category rich in champion in Europe. Singmanee is ready to face the best European representatives.

He faced Houcine Bennoui at Thai Fight: Lyon on September 19, 2012 in Lyon, France and lost via decision after three rounds.

He was scheduled to face Rachid Boumalek in the quarter-finals of the 2012 Thai Fight 67 kg Tournament at Thai Fight 2012: King of Muay Thai on October 23, 2012 in Bangkok. However, Boumalek pulled out and was replaced by Valdrin Vatnikaj, who Singmanee beat by decision.

He then beat Mehdi Zatout by unanimous decision in the tournament semi-finals in Nakhon Ratchasima, Thailand on November 25, 2012.

He defeated Andrei Kulebin on points in the final on December 16, 2012 to win the tournament.

Singmanee stopped Salardine Etnaker  with a liver shot to retain his WPMF belt at Muaythai Superfight in Pattaya on June 14, 2013.

He will put his WPMF welterweight strap on the line against Sean Kearney at the King's Cup 2013 in Bangkok, Thailand on December 4, 2013.

He lost to Desrit Poptheeratham on points on March 17, 2014.

He lost to Kem Sitsongpeenong via TKO due to a cut in round two at Muay Thai in Macau on June 6, 2014.

Titles and achievements
EM Legend
 2016 Emei Legend 65 kg Tournament Champion.
Faith Fight
 2016 Faith Fight 67 kg Champion.
Thai Fight
 Thai Fight 2012 67 kg Tournament Champion
World Professional Muaythai Federation
 2012 W.P.M.F. World Welterweight champion (147 lbs)
Isuzu Cup
 2012 22nd Isuzu Cup Tournament Winner
Channel 3 TV 
 2008 Channel 3 TV Super Lightweight Champion (140 lbs)
World Muaythai Council
 2007 WMC Super Lightweight champion (140 lbs)
Rajadamnern Stadium
 2007 Rajadamnern Stadium Super Lightweight champion (140 lbs)

Muay Thai record

|-  style="background:#CCFFCC;"
| 2019-03-17|| Win ||align=left| Buakiew Sitsongpeenong || Miracle Muay Thai Festival, Final || Phra Nakhon Si Ayutthaya (city), Thailand || KO || 1 ||
|-  style="background:#CCFFCC;"
| 2019-03-17|| Win ||align=left| Hossein Nasiri || Miracle Muay Thai Festival, Semi Final || Phra Nakhon Si Ayutthaya (city), Thailand || KO || 1 ||
|-  style="background:#FFBBBB;"
| 2019-2-23 || Loss ||align=left| Roeung Sophorn || CNC Kun Khmer BTB || Cambodia || Decision || 3 || 3:00
|-  style="background:#CCFFCC;"
| 2018-11-2|| Win ||align=left| Vong Noy || CNC Kun Khmer || Cambodia || KO || 3 ||
|-  style="background:#CCFFCC;"
| 2018-03-17|| Win ||align=left| Numkabuan Kiatnavy  || Miracle Muay Thai Festival, Final || Phra Nakhon Si Ayutthaya (city), Thailand || KO || 1 ||
|-  style="background:#CCFFCC;"
| 2018-03-17|| Win ||align=left| Luis Cajaiba  || Miracle Muay Thai Festival, Semi Final || Phra Nakhon Si Ayutthaya (city), Thailand || Decision || 3 || 3:00
|-  style="background:#CCFFCC;"
| 2018-03-17|| Win ||align=left| Wesley Da Silva || Miracle Muay Thai Festival, Quarter Final || Phra Nakhon Si Ayutthaya (city), Thailand || KO || 2 ||
|-  bgcolor="#FFBBBB"
| 2018-01-20 || Loss ||align=left|  Chenlong Zhang || Emei Legend || China || Decision (Unanimous)  || 3 || 3:00
|-
|-  bgcolor="#CCFFCC"
| 2017-12-02|| Win ||align=left| Giannis Skordilis|| Emei Legend 26|| China || KO || 2 ||
|-  bgcolor="#FFBBBB"
| 2017-10-31|| Loss ||align=left| Andrei Kulebin ||World Muaythai Charity Fight || Hong Kong || Decision || 5 || 3:00
|-
|-  bgcolor="#CCFFCC"
| 2017-05-27|| Win ||align=left| Maykol Yurk || Emei Legend 19 || China || KO || 2 ||
|-
|-  bgcolor="#CCFFCC"
| 2017-05-27|| Win ||align=left| Li Chenchen || Emei Legend 19 || China || KO || 1 ||
|-  bgcolor="#FFBBBB"
| 2017-05-13|| Loss ||align=left| Bobo Sacko || La Nuit Des Titans 4 || France || Decision || 5 || 3:00
|-  bgcolor="#CCFFCC"
| 2016-12-23|| Win ||align=left| Rukiya Anpo || Emei Legend 15, 65 kg Tournament, final || China || Decision || 3 || 3:00
|-
! style=background:white colspan=9 |
|-
|-  bgcolor="#CCFFCC"
| 2016-12-23|| Win ||align=left| Manas Thodkui  || Emei Legend 15, 65 kg Tournament, semifinal || China || Extra Round Decision || 4 || 3:00 
|-  bgcolor="#CCFFCC"
| 2016-12-17|| Win ||align=left| Zhang Wanxin || Faith Fight Kickboxing || China || Decision (Unanimous) || 3 || 3:00
|-
! style=background:white colspan=9 |
|-  bgcolor="#CCFFCC"
| 2016-11-26|| Win ||align=left| Phosa Nopphorn || Faith Fight Kickboxing, 67 kg Tournament final || China || Decision (Unanimous) || 3 || 3:00
|-
! style=background:white colspan=9 |
|-  bgcolor="#CCFFCC"
| 2016-11-19|| Win ||align=left| Meng GuoDong || Emei Legend 14, 65 kg Tournament, quarterfinal || China || Decision (Unanimous) || 3 || 3:00
|-
|-  bgcolor="#CCFFCC"
| 2016-10-29|| Win ||align=left| Masoud Abdolmaleki || Faith Fight Kickboxing, 67 kg Tournament semifinal || China || Decision (Unanimous) || 3 || 3:00
|-
|-  bgcolor="#CCFFCC"
| 2016-10-01|| Win ||align=left| Matty Bune || E-1 World Championship || China || KO || 1 ||
|-
|-  bgcolor="#CCFFCC"
| 2016-08-27|| Win ||align=left| Speth Norbert Attila || Faith Fight Kickboxing, 67 kg Tournament quarterfinal || China || Decision (Unanimous) || 3 || 3:00
|-
|-  bgcolor="#CCFFCC"
| 2016-04-02|| Win ||align=left| Bobirjon Tagaev || Emei Legend 7, 65 kg Tournament, Group C final || China || TKO || 2 || 
|-
|-  bgcolor="#CCFFCC"
| 2016-04-02|| Win ||align=left| Lyu Junyu || Emei Legend 7, 65 kg Tournament, Group C semifinal || China || Decision || 3 || 
|-  bgcolor="#CCFFCC"
| 2016-03-16 || Win ||align=left| Yohann Drai || PAT & WPMF Champiohship || Ayutthaya, Thailand || Decision || 5 || 3:00
|-
! style=background:white colspan=9 |
|-
|-  bgcolor="#CCFFCC"
| 2016-02-20|| Win ||align=left| Zhang Chunyu || QUSN|| China || Decision || 3 || 
|-  bgcolor="#FFBBBB"
| 2015-08-07 || Loss ||align=left| Azize Hlali  || West Coast Fighting || Lacanau, France || Decision || 5 || 
|-  bgcolor="#CCFFCC"
| 2015-06-12|| Win ||align=left| Vahid Shabazi || Final Legend|| China || Decision || 3 || 
|-
|-  bgcolor="#CCFFCC"
| 2015-03-17 || Win ||align=left| Saksonkram Poptheeratham || Miracle MuayThai || Ayutthaya, Thailand || Decision || 5 || 3:00
|-
! style=background:white colspan=9 |
|-
|-  bgcolor="#CCFFCC"
| 2014-12-04 || Win ||align=left| Timur Mamatisakov || King’s birthday celebration MuayThai competition || Bangkok, Thailand || Decision || 5 || 3:00
|-
! style=background:white colspan=9 |
|-
|-  bgcolor="#FFBBBB"
| 2014-06-06 || Loss ||align=left| Kem Sitsongpeenong || Muay Thai in Macau || Macau || TKO (cut) || 2 || 
|-
|-  bgcolor="#FFBBBB"
| 2014-03-24 || Loss || align=left| Dejrit Poptheeratham || Miracle Muay Thai Festival || Phra Nakhon Si Ayutthaya, Thailand || Decision || 5 || 3:00
|-
! style=background:white colspan=9 |
|-
|-  bgcolor="#CCFFCC"
| 2013-12-27 || Win ||align=left| Jimmy Vienot || Klongsarn|| Bangkok, Thailand || Decision || 5 || 3:00
|-
|-  bgcolor="#CCFFCC"
| 2013-12-04 || Win ||align=left| Sean Kearney || King's Cup 2013 || Bangkok, Thailand || KO (left low kick) || 3 || 
|-
! style=background:white colspan=9 |
|-
|-  bgcolor="#FFBBBB"
| 2013-09-07 || Loss ||align=left| Mehdi Zatout || || France || Decision || 5 || 3:00
|-
! style=background:white colspan=9 |
|-
|-  bgcolor="#CCFFCC"
| 2013-07-26 || Win ||align=left| Adaylton Freitas || || Bangkok, Thailand || Decision || 5 || 3:00
|-
! style=background:white colspan=9 |
|-
|-  bgcolor="#CCFFCC"
| 2013-06-14 || Win ||align=left| Salahdine Ait Naceur || Muaythai Superfight || Pattaya, Thailand || KO (right hook to the body) || 1 || 
|-
! style=background:white colspan=9 |
|-
|-  bgcolor="#CCFFCC"
| 2013-05-17 || Win ||align=left| Chalee Sor Chaitamin || Bangla Stadium || Phuket, Thailand || KO || 3 || 
|-
! style=background:white colspan=9 |
|-
|-
|-  bgcolor="#CCFFCC"
| 2013-03-17 || Win ||align=left| Azize Hlali || World Muay Thai Festival 2013 || Ayutthaya, Thailand || Decision || 5 || 3:00
|-
! style=background:white colspan=9 |
|-
|-  bgcolor="#CCFFCC"
| 2012-12-16 || Win ||align=left| Andrei Kulebin || THAI FIGHT 2012: Final Round, 67 kg Tournament Final || Bangkok, Thailand || Decision || 3 || 3:00
|-
! style=background:white colspan=9 |
|-
|-  bgcolor="#CCFFCC"
| 2012-11-25 || Win ||align=left| Mehdi Zatout || THAI FIGHT 2012: 2nd Round, 67 kg Tournament Semi-Finals || Nakhon Ratchasima, Thailand || Decision (unanimous) || 3 || 3:00
|-
|-  bgcolor="#CCFFCC"
| 2012-10-23 || Win ||align=left| Valdrin Vatnikaj || THAI FIGHT 2012: 1st Round, 67 kg Tournament Quarter-Finals || Bangkok, Thailand || Decision || 3 || 3:00
|-
|-  bgcolor="#FFBBBB"
| 2012-09-19 || Loss ||align=left| Houcine Bennoui || THAI FIGHT EXTREME 2012: France || Lyon, France || Decision || 3 || 3:00
|-
|-  bgcolor="#CCFFCC"
| 2012-08-17 || Win ||align=left| Houcine Bennoui || THAI FIGHT EXTREME 2012: England  || Leicester, England || Decision || 3 || 3:00
|-
|-  bgcolor="#CCFFCC"
| 2012-06-24 || Win ||align=left| Andrei Kulebin || Channel 11 "Thailand vs. Russia" || Pattaya, Thailand || Decision || 5 || 3:00
|-
! style=background:white colspan=9 |
|-
|-  bgcolor="#CCFFCC"
| 2012-04-17 || Win ||align=left| Sudsakorn Sor Klinmee || THAI FIGHT EXTREME 2012: Pattaya  || Pattaya, Thailand || Decision || 3 || 3:00
|-
|-  bgcolor="#CCFFCC"
| 2012-03-24 || Win ||align=left| Superball Lookjaomaesaivaree || Isuzu Tournament Final, Omnoi Stadium || Bangkok, Thailand || Decision || 5 || 3:00
|-
! style=background:white colspan=9 |
|-
|-  bgcolor="#CCFFCC"
| 2012-01-21 || Win ||align=left| Phetaswin Seatranferry || Isuzu Tournament Semi Final, Omnoi Stadium || Bangkok, Thailand || KO (Right Hook) || 3 || 
|-
|-  bgcolor="#CCFFCC"
| 2011-11-19 || Win ||align=left| Noppakrit Namplatrahoymuk || Isuzu Tournament, Omnoi Stadium || Bangkok, Thailand || Decision || 5 || 3:00
|-
|-  bgcolor="#CCFFCC"
| 2011-10-08 || Win ||align=left| Ekusung Kor Rungtanakiat || Isuzu Tournament, Omnoi Stadium || Bangkok, Thailand || Decision || 5 || 3:00
|-
|-  bgcolor="#CCFFCC"
| 2011-09-03 || Win ||align=left| Samranchai 96 Peenung || Isuzu Tournament, Omnoi Stadium || Bangkok, Thailand || Decision || 5 || 3:00
|-
|-  bgcolor="#FFBBBB"
| 2011-06-13 || Loss ||align=left| Saenchainoi Pumphanmuang || Yodwanpadej Fight, Rajadamnern Stadium || Bangkok, Thailand || Decision || 5 || 3:00
|-
|-  bgcolor="#CCFFCC"
| 2011-05-21 || Win ||align=left| Songniyom Pumpanmuang || Fuktien Group Tournament, Omnoi  Stadium || Bangkok, Thailand || Decision || 5 || 3:00
|-
|-  bgcolor="#FFBBBB"
| 2011-04-16 || Loss ||align=left| Sitthichai Sitsongpeenong || Fuktien Group Tournament, Omnoi  Stadium || Bangkok, Thailand || Decision || 5 || 3:00
|-
|-  bgcolor="#CCFFCC"
| 2011-03-20 || Win ||align=left| Pong Sak Lek || Muaythai Gala || Surin, Thailand ||  ||  || 
|-
|-  bgcolor="#FFBBBB"
| 2010-06-05 || Loss ||align=left| Fabio Pinca || La Nuit des Challenges 8 || Lyon, Saint-Fons, France || Decision (Unanimous) || 5 || 3:00
|-
|-  bgcolor="#CCFFCC"
| 2010-03-10 || Win ||align=left| Olan Kaewsamrit || Daorungchujaroen Fight, Rajadamnern Stadium || Bangkok, Thailand || Decision || 5 || 3:00
|-
|-  bgcolor="#FFBBBB"
| 2009-12-05 || Loss ||align=left| Igor Petrov || Battle of Champions 4 || Moscow, Russia || Decision || 3 || 3:00
|-
|-  bgcolor="#CCFFCC"
| 2009-10-21 || Win ||align=left| Kongfar Eminentair || Yodwanpaded Fight, Rajadamnern Stadium || Bangkok, Thailand || Disqualification || 4 || 
|-
|-  bgcolor="#CCFFCC"
| 2009-10-13 || Win ||align=left| Khomkaew Russada || Bangla Boxing Stadium || Patong, Thailand || Decision || 5 || 3:00
|-
! style=background:white colspan=9 |
|-
|-  bgcolor="#CCFFCC"
| 2009-09-21 || Win ||align=left| Petaswin Seatranferry || Daorungchujaroen Fight, Rajadamnern Stadium || Bangkok, Thailand || TKO || 3 || 
|-
! style=background:white colspan=9 |
|-
|-  bgcolor="#CCFFCC"
| 2009-08-09 || Win ||align=left| Kengkard || Channel 9 TV || Bangkok, Thailand || Decision || 5 || 3:00
|-
|-  bgcolor="#CCFFCC"
| 2009-07-09 || Win ||align=left| Petchmankong Kaiyanghadaogym || Suek Jao Muaythai, Ormnorm Arena || Bangkok, Thailand || KO (Right Hook) || 4 || 
|-
|-  bgcolor="#CCFFCC"
| 2009-02-20 || Win ||align=left| Kongfah Auddonmuang || Eminentair Fight, Lumpinee Stadium || Bangkok, Thailand || Decision || 5 || 3:00
|-
|-  bgcolor="#CCFFCC"
| 2009-01-19 || Win ||align=left| Big Ben Chor Praram 6 || Daorungchujaroen Fights, Rajadamnern Stadium || Bangkok, Thailand || Decision || 5 || 3:00
|-
|-  bgcolor="#CCFFCC"
| 2008-12-13 || Win ||align=left| Thanongdet Chengsimiewgym || Siam Omnoi Stadium || Bangkok, Thailand || Decision || 5 || 3:00
|-
|-  bgcolor="#FFBBBB"
| 2008-08-14 || Loss ||align=left| Khem Fairtex || Jarumueang fights, Rajadamnern Stadium || Bangkok, Thailand || KO (Right overhand)|| 5 || 0:59
|-
|-  bgcolor="#CCFFCC"
| 2008-07-03 || Win ||align=left| Jaroenchai Kesagym || Daorungchujarern Fights, Rajadamnern Stadium || Bangkok, Thailand || Decision || 5 || 3:00
|-
|-  bgcolor="#c5d2ea"
| 2008-05-25 || Draw ||align=left| Noppadet Chengsimiwgym || BBTV TV7 Channel || Bangkok, Thailand || Decision draw || 5 || 3:00
|-
! style=background:white colspan=9 |
|-
|-  bgcolor="#CCFFCC"
| 2008-03-09 || Win ||align=left| Hiroki Ishii || SNKA "Magnum 16" || Bunkyo, Tokyo, Japan || Decision (Unanimous) || 5 || 3:00 
|-
! style=background:white colspan=9 |
|-
|-  bgcolor="#CCFFCC"
| 2007-10-27 || Win ||align=left| Saiyok Pumpanmuang || Rajadamnern Stadium || Bangkok, Thailand || Decision || 5 || 3:00
|-
! style=background:white colspan=9 |
|-
|-  bgcolor="#CCFFCC"
| 2007-08-09 || Win ||align=left| Nampon P.K. Stereo || Rajadamnern Stadium || Bangkok, Thailand || KO (Body punches) || 2 || 
|-
|-  bgcolor="#CCFFCC"
| 2007-03-15 || Win ||align=left| Surarit Phetnongkee || Daowrungchujarern Fights, Rajadamnern Stadium || Bangkok, Thailand || Decision || 5 || 3:00

|-  bgcolor="#fbb"
| 2006-11-12 || Loss||align=left| Tapluang Bor Chor Ror.2 || Chujarean, Rajadamnern Stadium || Bangkok, Thailand || Decision || 5 || 3:00

|-  bgcolor="#FFBBBB"
| 2006-10-12 || Loss ||align=left| Kongjak Sor. Tuanthong || Bangrajan Fights, Rajadamnern Stadium || Bangkok, Thailand || Decision || 5 || 3:00
|-  bgcolor="#CCFFCC"
| 2006-08-27 || Win ||align=left| Artpon Por. Samranchai || Rajadamnern Chujarean TTV Fights, Rajadamnern Stadium || Bangkok, Thailand || TKO || 3 || 
|-  bgcolor="#CCFFCC"
| 2006-08-06 || Win ||align=left| Daochai Sitniran || Rajadamnern Chujarean TTV Fights, Rajadamnern Stadium || Bangkok, Thailand || TKO || 3 || 
|-  bgcolor="#FFBBBB"
| 2006-07-02 || Loss ||align=left| Sonkom Jockygym || Rajadamnern Chujarean TTV, Rajadamnern Stadium || Bangkok, Thailand || Decision || 5 || 3:00
|-  bgcolor="#CCFFCC"
| 2006-06-05 || Win ||align=left| Tawatchai Lukmaerampoei || Daorungchujarean Fights, Rajadamnern Stadium || Bangkok, Thailand || TKO || 4 ||
|-  bgcolor="#FFBBBB"
| 2006-02-09 || Loss ||align=left| Tapluang Bor Chor Ror.2 || Daorungchujarean Fights, Rajadamnern Stadium || Bangkok, Thailand || Decision || 5 || 3:00
|-  bgcolor="#CCFFCC"
| 2005-10-26 || Win ||align=left| Singdam Sor. Boonya || Jarumueang Fights, Rajadamnern Stadium || Bangkok, Thailand || Decision || 5 ||
|-  bgcolor="#FFBBBB"
| 2004-04-14 || Loss ||align=left| Tapluang Bor Chor Ror.2 || Daorungchujarean Fights, Rajadamnern Stadium || Bangkok, Thailand || Decision || 5 || 3:00
|-  bgcolor="#FFBBBB"
| 2004-02-23 || Loss ||align=left| Sornkom Kiatnukoon || Daorungchujarean + Jarumueang Fights, Rajadamnern Stadium || Bangkok, Thailand || Decision || 5 || 3:00
|-  bgcolor="#CCFFCC"
| 2003-12-10 || Win ||align=left|  Tapluang Bor Chor Ror.2  || SUK Petchmahanak, Rajadamnern Stadium || Bangkok, Thailand || Decision || 5 ||3:00
|-  bgcolor="#FFBBBB"
| 2003-09-29 || Loss ||align=left| Klangsuan Sasiprapagym || SUK Daorungchujarean, Rajadamnern Stadium || Bangkok, Thailand || Decision || 5 || 3:00
|-  bgcolor="#FFBBBB"
| 2003-08-27 || Loss ||align=left| Jkkawanlak Saktewan || SUK Daorungchujarean, Rajadamnern Stadium || Bangkok, Thailand || Decision || 5 || 3:00
|-  bgcolor="#CCFFCC"
| 2003-07-21 || Win ||align=left| Srisawat Sakmueangkong || Suk Daorungchujarearn & Jarumueang, Rajadamnern Stadium || Bangkok, Thailand || Decision || 5 ||
|-
|-
| colspan=9 | Legend:

Lethwei record 

|-  style="background:#c5d2ea;"
| 2019-04-15|| Draw ||align=left| Thway Thit Win Hlaing || Myanmar vs. Thailand Challenge Fights || Myawaddy Township, Myanmar || Draw || 5 || 3:00
|-  bgcolor="#c5d2ea"
| 2018-06-23 || Draw || align="left" | Soe Lin Oo || Myanmar Lethwei Fight || Mandalay, Myanmar || Draw || 5 || 3:00
|-  bgcolor="#c5d2ea"
| 2017-11-19 || Draw || align="left" | Saw Gaw Mu Do || Lethwei Nation Fight 3 || Yangon, Myanmar || Draw || 5 || 3:00
|-  bgcolor="#c5d2ea"
| 2017-01-05 || Draw || align="left" | Phyan Thway || NME Battle For Glory || Taungoo, Myanmar || Draw || 5 || 3:00
|-
| colspan=9 | Legend:

See also 
List of male kickboxers

References

External links

Living people
Welterweight kickboxers
Singmanee Kaewsamrit
Singmanee Kaewsamrit
1983 births
Singmanee Kaewsamrit